The Matitanana river in Fitovinany region, is located in eastern Madagascar. It flows into the Indian Ocean near Vohipeno.

Falls
Ankitso falls

References 

Rivers of Madagascar
Rivers of Fitovinany